Sean Patrick Michael McNamara (born May 9, 1962) is an American film director, film producer, actor, and screenwriter.

McNamara was born in Burbank, California. He is best known for his feature films Soul Surfer and The Miracle Season. In the pre-teen film market he worked with Jessica Alba, Hilary Duff, Shia LaBeouf, Christy Carlson Romano and Raven-Symoné. McNamara and David Brookwell are the founders of the Brookwell McNamara Entertainment production company. McNamara has continued to produce and create shows for MTV's The N, Nickelodeon, Disney Channel, and Cartoon Network. He collaborated with Shin Sang-ok to make Galgameth and 3 Ninjas: High Noon at Mega Mountain, starring Hulk Hogan.

McNamara briefly appeared as the singing cowboy in the Even Stevens musical episode "Influenza: The Musical", and as an alleged alien abductee in the episode "Close Encounters of the Beans Kind". McNamara also had a cameo appearance on That's So Raven, appearing as a plumber in the episode "Out of Control".

In 2016, McNamara was hired to direct the upcoming 2023 biopic of President Ronald Reagan titled Reagan.

Crew work

Films
 Hollywood Chaos (1989)
 Galgameth (1996)
 Casper: A Spirited Beginning (1997)
 Casper Meets Wendy (1998)
 3 Ninjas: High Noon at Mega Mountain (1998)
 P.U.N.K.S. (1999)
 Treehouse Hostage (1999)
 Race to Space (2001)
 The Even Stevens Movie (2003)
 Raise Your Voice (2004)
 The Cutting Edge: Going for the Gold (2006)
 McKids Adventures: Treasure Hunt with Ronald (2006)
 McKids Adventures: Get Up and Go with Ronald (2006)
 Bratz (director) (2007)
 Into the Blue 2: The Reef (2009)
 Bring It On: Fight to the Finish (2009)
 The Suite Life Movie (2011)
 Soul Surfer (director) (2011)
 Baby Geniuses and the Mystery of the Crown Jewels (2013)
 Robosapien: Rebooted (2013)
 Space Warriors (2013)
 Baby Geniuses and the Treasures of Egypt (2014)
 Field of Lost Shoes (2014)
 Spare Parts (2015)
 Hoovey (2015)
 Baby Geniuses and the Space Baby (2015)
 Just in Time for Christmas (2015)
 Love in Paradise (2016)
 Aliens Ate My Homework (2018)
 The Miracle Season (2018)
 Christmas in Evergreen: Letters to Santa (2018)
 Christmas in Evergreen: Tidings of Joy (2019)
 Mighty Oak (2020)
 Aliens Stole My Body (2020)
 Cats & Dogs 3: Paws Unite! (2020)
 Just Swipe (2021)
 Sister Swap (2021)
 The King's Daughter (2022)
 On a Wing and a Prayer (2023)
 Reagan (2023)

Television
Kids Incorporated (producer) (1984)
The Secret World of Alex Mack (producer, director) (1994)
Even Stevens (executive producer, director) (2000–2003)
That's So Raven (executive producer, director) (2003–2006)
Just for Kicks (executive producer, director) (2006)
Beyond the Break (executive producer, director) (2006–2009)
Cake (executive producer, director) (2006)
Dance Revolution (executive producer, director) (2006–2007)
Out of Jimmy's Head (2007–2008) (executive producer - 19 episodes)
Zeke and Luther (director) (2009) 
Shake It Up (director) (2011)
Kickin' It (director) (2011–2012)
Jessie (director) (2012)
A.N.T. Farm (director) (2012)
Gabby Duran & the Unsittables (director) (2019)

Personal life 
McNamara is Catholic.

Awards and nominations

References

External links
Sean McNamara's Official Homepage

Sean McNamara's Bio
Brookwell/McNamara Entertainment

1962 births
American male film actors
American male screenwriters
American male television actors
American television directors
Television producers from New York (state)
American television writers
Living people
People from Greater Los Angeles
Catholics from California
Film directors from California
American male television writers
Brookwell McNamara Entertainment
Screenwriters from New York (state)
Screenwriters from California